The Zunyi Conference was a meeting of the Chinese Communist Party (CCP) in January 1935 during the Long March.  This meeting involved a power struggle between the leadership of Bo Gu and Otto Braun and the opposition led by Mao Zedong. The result was that Mao left the meeting in position to take over military command and become the leader of the Communist Party. The conference was completely unacknowledged until the 1950s and still no detailed descriptions were available until the fiftieth anniversary in 1985.

Background
In August 1934, with the Red Army depleted by the prolonged Chinese Civil War, a spy (Mo Xiong) placed by Zhou Enlai in the KMT army headquarters in Nanchang brought news that Chiang Kai-shek was preparing a major offensive against the  Chinese Soviet Republic's capital, Ruijin. The Communist leadership decided on a strategic retreat to regroup with other Communist units, and to avoid annihilation. The original plan was for the First Red Army to link up with the Second Red Army commanded by He Long, thought to be in Hubei to the west and north. Communications between divided groups of the Red Army had been disrupted by the Kuomintang campaign, and during the planning to evacuate Jiangxi, the First Red Army was unaware that these other Communist forces were also retreating westward.

Initially the First Red Army, with its baggage of top communist officials, records, currency reserves and other trapping of the exiled Chinese Soviet Republic, fought through several lightly defended Kuomintang checkpoints, crossing the Xinfeng River and through the province of Guangdong, south of Hunan and into Guangxi. At the Xiang river, Chiang Kai-shek had reinforced the KMT defenses. In two days of bloody fighting, 30 November to 1 December 1934,  the Red Army lost more than 40,000 troops and all of the civilian porters, and there were strongly defended Nationalist defensive lines ahead. Personnel and material losses after the battle of the Xiang river affected the morale of the troops and desertions began. By a 12 December 1934 meeting of Party leaders in Tongdao, discontent with Bo Gu and Otto Braun appeared.  Under these conditions, the Communists met in Zunyi to reshuffle the Party politburo.

Meeting
In January 1935, after the Red Army took over the city of Zunyi, a town of military importance in Guizhou, Southwest China, an enlarged meeting of the politburo of the CCP was held.  It was once commonly thought to have been held from January 6–8, but now it is accepted to have taken place between January 15–17.

The names and numbers of participants in the conference have always been disputed.  These details are of importance to the largely Soviet view that elected members of the party were outvoted by non-members. Those who are most strongly agreed to have attended by all are Mao Zedong, Zhou Enlai, Zhu De, Chen Yun, Liu Shaoqi, Zhang Wentian, Bo Gu, Liu Bocheng, Li Fuchun, Lin Biao, and Peng Dehuai.  Chinese sources which show that non-members could not have outvoted members have the following participants:

 Politburo members: Mao Zedong, Zhou Enlai, Zhu De, Chen Yun, Zhang Wentian, Bo Gu.
 Alternate politburo members: Wang Jiaxiang; Liu Shaoqi; Deng Fa, the notorious boss of the secret police for the CCP; Kai Feng (He Kequan), leader of CY.
 Generals: Liu Bocheng, Chief of Staff of Red Army; Li Fuchun, acting director of political department of Red Army (acting General Commissar); Lin Biao, and commander of 1st Field Army; Peng Dehuai, commander of 3rd Field Army; Nie Rongzhen, Lin's commissar; Yang Shangkun, Peng's commissar and another member of 28 Bolsheviks; and Li Zhuoran.
 Secretariat and chief editor of the CCP newspaper, the Red Star, Deng Xiaoping.
 Otto Braun and his interpreter Wu Xiuquan.

Various scholars dispute the attendance of Chen Yun, Liu Shaoqi, Wang Jiaxiang, He Kequan, Deng Fa, Nie Rongzhen, and Deng Xiaoping.  On the other hand, Liang Botai, Wu Liangping, Teng Daiyuan, Li Weihan, Wang Shoudao, and Yang Shangkun are also held to have attended by some sources.

Conference agenda and speeches

The main agenda of this conference was to examine the Party's failure in the Jiangxi region and to look at the options now available to them. Bo Gu was the first to speak with a general report. He acknowledged that the strategy used in Jiangxi had failed without taking any blame. He claimed the lack of success was not due to poor planning. Next, Zhou gave a report on the military situation in an apologetic style. In contrast to Bo, he admitted mistakes had been made. Then, Zhang Wentian condemned the leaders for the debacle in Jiangxi in a long, critical oration, which was supported by Mao and Wang. Mao's comparative distance from power over the past two years had left him blameless of the recent failures and in a strong position to attack the leadership.

Mao insisted that Bo Gu and Otto Braun had made fundamental military mistakes by using tactics of pure defense, rather than initiating a more mobile war. Mao's supporters gained momentum during the meeting and Zhou Enlai eventually moved to back Mao. Under the principle of democracy for majority, the secretariat of the Central Committee and Central Revolution & Military Committee of CCP were reelected. Bo and Braun were demoted while Zhou maintained his position now sharing military command with Zhu De. Zhang Wentian took Bo's previous position,a nd Mao once again joined the Central Committee.

The Zunyi Conference confirmed that the CCP should turn away from the 28 Bolsheviks and towards Mao. The Red Army regained its military power, survived in Yan'an and ultimately defeated the KMT using a guerrilla strategy, and later through conventional warfare as it gained mass peasant support. It could be seen as a victory for those old CCP members who had their roots in China and, on the contrary, was a great loss for those CCP members such as the 28 Bolsheviks who had studied in Moscow and had been trained by the Comintern and the Soviet Union and could be regarded as protégés or agents of Comintern accordingly. After the Zunyi Conference, the influence and involvement of the Comintern in CCP affairs was greatly reduced.

See also
Ningdu Conference (1932)

References 

 Mao Zedong, Zhou Enlai and the Evolution of the Chinese Communist Leadership
 The Search for Modern China
 Mao

External links 
F. S. Litten: The Myth of the 'Turning-Point' - Towards a New Understanding of the Long March (article in 'Bochumer Jahrbuch zur Ostasienforschung', 2001)

Assemblies of the Chinese Communist Party
1935 in China
History of Guizhou
1935 conferences
Major National Historical and Cultural Sites in Guizhou